Dongsheng is a town in southern Hubei province, China, about  south of the Yangtze River,  east of Shishou, which administers it, and  north of the border with Hunan. , it has 3 residential communities and 33 villages under its administration.

Administrative divisions
Three communities:
Huajiadang, Ping'an, Jiaoshanhe

Thirty-three villages:
Tunzishan, Tongzigang, Fengshan, Tuchengyuan, Sanjiayuan, Zhuangjiapu, Chenjiapu, Changdisi, Bijiatang, Zinandi, Xindikou, Wanghai, Huayuhu, Lianghu, Huangjiatan, Yazihu, Nanhetou, Yuelianghu, Machuan, Xianzhongmiao, Dayangshu, Zoumaling, Guanluqi, Xiemamiao, Bajiaoling, Jiangjiachong, Dongjialou, Yanglin, Dongsheng, Sanheyuan, Yujiapeng, Xingangkou, Yayanqiao

Four other areas:
Yazihu, State-run Farm, Shangjinhu, Yanzhi

See also 
 List of township-level divisions of Hubei

References 

Township-level divisions of Hubei